Squash Racquets Association Of Malaysia (SRAM) is the National Organisation for Squash in Malaysia.  The company was founded in 1972 at the Royal Lake Club.

External links
Official site

See also
 Malaysia men's national squash team
 Malaysia women's national squash team

Squash
Squash in Malaysia
Malaysia
Educational institutions established in 1972
1972 establishments in Malaysia